The Shenandoah Huns were a minor league baseball club, based in Shenandoah, Pennsylvania in 1894 and 1895. The team was formed when the Scranton Miners jumped from the Pennsylvania State League to the Eastern League on July 26, 1894. A week later the Huns were formed to replace Scranton in the league on August 2. The team continued to play in the Pennsylvania State League the following year, but disbanded during the season on May 20, 1895.

Prior to the Huns, Shenandoah fielded the Shenandoah Hungarian Rioters a minor league team that played from 1888 to 1889 in the Middle States League and the Central League.

Season-by-season

References

Defunct minor league baseball teams
Defunct baseball teams in Pennsylvania
Baseball teams established in 1894
Baseball teams disestablished in 1895
1894 establishments in Pennsylvania
1895 disestablishments in Pennsylvania
Schuylkill County, Pennsylvania